Japanese musician Ringo Sheena has filmed 30 music videos in her solo project single her debut in 1998. She has released a number of music video compilations and live concerts to VHS, DVD and Blu-ray, including the short film project Hyakuiro Megane, which was certified gold by the RIAJ for 100,000 copies shipped.

Music videos

Video albums

Music video compilations

Concert tour videos

Concert tour video box sets

Short film

See also 
List of bands associated with Ringo Sheena
Ringo Sheena production discography
Ringo Sheena discography
Tokyo Jihen discography

Notes

References

Videography
Videographies of Japanese artists